Aquinas Catholic College, Menai is a private, Roman Catholic, co-educational, systemic high school in Menai, New South Wales, Australia. It was established in 1993 and is located in the Roman Catholic Archdiocese of Sydney.

Curriculum 
Subjects offered for the Higher School Certificate include English, general mathematics, mathematics, chemistry, physics, biology, science, religion, geography, legal studies, modern history, ancient history, history extension, economics, business studies, dance, drama, earth and environmental science, music, visual arts, Italian, Japanese, personal development, health and physical education, industrial technology, design and technology, community and family studies, food technology, information processes and technology, software design and development. For students not interested in general studies of religion, a non-Universities Admission Index subject, Catholic studies are available.

In addition, the school offers several vocational education courses including construction, hospitality and retail operations.

For years nine and ten, the school offers a variety of elective courses to students, including music, drama, visual arts, commerce, design and technology, information software technology, multimedia and photography, wood technology, food technology, sport science, Italian, Indonesian and Japanese.

Extracurricular activities 
The school offers a range of extracurricular activities including cricket, Australian rules football, rugby league, oz-tag, rugby union, football, debating, public speaking, music, drama, athletics, swimming, basketball, netball, cross country running, waterpolo, chess and volleyball.

House system 
The school has a house system of four houses which are named after a Catholic historical figure and represented by a colour. Students are allocated to a house then placed into a vertically streamed pastoral class which is led by two elected year twelve senior house leaders. They compete for the House Cup in a variety of events.

The houses are:

 MacKillop — named after Mary MacKillop and represented by the colour blue
 LaSalle — named after Jean-Baptiste de La Salle and represented by the colour green
 Nagle — named after Nano Nagle and represented by the colour gold
 Rice — named after Edmund Ignatius Rice and represented by the colour red

Notable alumni 
 Dom Alessio, radio personality, music journalist and blogger
 Jayden Brailey, rugby league footballer
 Antony Golec, professional footballer
 Chris Naumoff, professional footballer
 James Roumanos, rugby league footballer
 Jordan Holmes, professional footballer

See also 
 List of Catholic schools in New South Wales
 Catholic education in Australia

References

External links 
 

Sutherland Shire
Catholic secondary schools in Sydney
Roman Catholic Archdiocese of Sydney
Educational institutions established in 1993
1993 establishments in Australia